The Galle Lighthouse (also known as Pointe de Galle Light) is an onshore lighthouse in Galle, Sri Lanka and is operated and maintained by the Sri Lanka Ports Authority. This is Sri Lanka's oldest light station.

History
Philippus Baldaeus, a Dutch minister who served in the area in the late 1650s, detailed his observations of Galle Harbour, in his work, Description of the East India, Malabar and Coromandel Coasts, stating that there was an iron cannon placed on the ramparts and a lantern to guide the sailors on top of the 28 feet above sea level rock which jutted out into the sea.

The first lighthouse at Galle was built by the British in 1848. It was a  iron lighthouse, constructed from cast-iron plates, imported from England, designed by British architect Alexander Gordon and erected by Messrs. Robinson, Engineers of Pimlico. The lighthouse, painted white, was located on the southwest bastion, Utrtecht Bastion, of Galle fort on the western side of Galle Harbor. In July 1936 it was destroyed by fire.

The original light was furnished with a glass prism lens floating in a bath of mercury (to reduce friction) and was powered by a weight driven machine.

The light station is within the walls of the ancient Galle Fort, a UNESCO World Heritage Site and well known tourist attraction.

See also

List of lighthouses in Sri Lanka

References

External links
Galle Light
British Library photograph of the original 1848 lighthouse
 Sri Lanka Ports Authority 
 Lighthouses of Sri Lanka

Lighthouses completed in 1848
Lighthouses completed in 1839
Lighthouses in Sri Lanka
Buildings and structures in Galle
Tourist attractions in Southern Province, Sri Lanka